People with the surname Lone include:

 Abdul Ghani Lone (1932–2002), Indian Kashmiri politician and separatist leader
 Ghulam Nabi Lone, Indian Kashmiri politician from the Jammu and Kashmir Peoples Democratic Party
 John Lone (born 1952), Hong Kong-born American actor
 Lars Lone, American politician from Wyoming
 Mohammad Akbar Lone Indian Kashmiri politician from the National Conference party
 Sajjad Gani Lone (born 1967), Indian Kashmiri politician and MLA
 Salim Lone, Kenyan journalist
 Steinar Lone (born 1955), Norwegian translator
 Austin de Lone (born 1956), American musician
 Erika deLone (born 1972), American tennis player
 William H. DeLone (born 1946), American organizational theorist
 Hugh O'Lone (ca 1836 – 1871), American-born saloon keeper and political figure in Canada

Social groups of Jammu and Kashmir
Social groups of Punjab, Pakistan
Indian surnames
Hindu surnames
Kashmiri-language surnames
Kashmiri tribes